Maafaru as a place name may refer to:
 Maafaru (Noonu Atoll) (Republic of Maldives)
 Maafaru (Raa Atoll) (Republic of Maldives)